Parshvanath Jain temple, Varanasi is situated in Bhelupur, Uttar Pradesh.

History
Varanasi is as one of the most holiest Jain pilgrimage center and believed to be birthplace of four Tirthankar - Parshvanatha, Suparshvanatha, Chandraprabha and Shreyansanath. This is considered as one of the most holiest pilgrimage places. Bhelpur is believed to be birthplace of Parshvanath, the 23rd Thirthankara, hence, a place for three kalyanak - Chyavan, Janm, and Deeksha. Mahavira also delivered sermons at Varanasi and Sarnath.

Vividha Tirtha Kalpa, composed by Jinaprabha Suri in the 14th century CE, gives a detailed description of this temple.

About temple 
A beautiful temple dedicated to Parshvanath is built here. The mulnayak of this temple is a  black-coloured digambar idol of Parshvanatha dating back to 9th-11th century and a  white-coloured shvetambar idol of Parshvanatha. It is located in Bhelapur about 5 km from the center of Varanasi city and 3 km from the Banaras Hindu University. It belongs to both sects of Jainism and is a holy tirtha or pilgrimage centre for Jains.

See also 
 Hastinapur

References

Bibliography

External links 
 

Jain temples in Uttar Pradesh
Religion in Varanasi
Buildings and structures in Varanasi
Tourist attractions in Varanasi district